Javier Benítez Pomares (born 3 January 1979, in Canals) is a Spanish former cyclist.

Major results

2003
1st Stage 3 Vuelta a Extremadura
1st Stage 1 Vuelta a la Comunidad de Madrid
2004
1st Stages 1b & 3 Vuelta a León
2006
1st Stages 2, 4 & 5 Vuelta a Extremadura
1st Stages 1, 2 & 4 Volta a Portugal
1st Stages 2 & 4 GP CTT Correios de Portugal
1st Stages 1 & 2 Troféu Joaquim Agostinho
3rd Circuito de Getxo
2007
1st Stages 2, 3a & 5 Volta ao Alentejo
1st Stages 1 & 4 Volta ao Distrito de Santarém
1st Stages 1, 3 & 4 Troféu Joaquim Agostinho
3rd Neuseen Classics
2008
1st Overall Grande Prémio Crédito Agrícola de la Costa Azul
1st Stage 4
1st Stages 1, 5 & 7 Vuelta a Chihuahua
2009
1st Stages 1, 2 & 6 Vuelta a Chihuahua

References

1979 births
Living people
Spanish male cyclists
People from Costera
Sportspeople from the Province of Valencia
Cyclists from the Valencian Community